St. Bartholomew's School (known colloquially as St Bart's) has been a non-selective local comprehensive school since 1975. It is a co-educational state funded academy school whose predecessor schools were founded in 1466 in Newbury, Berkshire in the United Kingdom. It accepts students aged 11–18 within its local geographical catchment area, and has approximately 1,970 students on roll, including a sixth form of around 620. It is currently rated by Ofsted as "Outstanding".

House system

The school operates a house system whereby the student body is divided into four houses, each named for a former pupil who died in the First World War:
George Ashwin Curnock - Green
 Alexander Herbert Davis - Red
Bertram Saxelbye Evers - Blue
Robert Arthur Patterson - Yellow
Students from each house enter into annual competitions in sport and the arts versus the other houses, where pupils represent their house. Examples of House Sports competitions are house netball, house football, house rugby, house lacrosse, house hockey, house tennis, house rounders. There are also House arts events including dance, fine arts, music, filmmaking  and House Drama plays which are written by year 12 students (aged 16 and 17) and performed by year 10 students (aged 14 and 15). The winning house in each competition is awarded a certain number of points, which are accrued during the academic year.

Each house holds an annual house evening, where students entertain parents and staff with music, dance, drama, and comic sketches. Each house also has a nominated house charity. Students try to raise as much money as possible for this charity through sponsored events and activities during the school year.

Facilities

The Ad Lucem project
Before the Ad Lucem project, St Bartholomew's School was based on two sites. The Luker site, at one end of Buckingham Road was formerly Newbury County Girls' Grammar School. The Wormestall site, at the opposite end of Buckingham Road, was formerly St Bartholomew's Boys' Grammar School - the two grammar schools had merged in 1975 to form a large comprehensive, spread over both sites.

On 23 November 2006, St. Bartholomew's was awarded a government grant to rebuild its premises. The school was chosen ahead of three other schools in Berkshire: Kennet School, Theale Green Community School, and John O'Gaunt Community Technology College. Whilst several proposals for St. Bartholomew's were considered, the final application involved completely rebuilding the school, with access provided through Fifth Road. This application was approved by a West Berkshire Council Planning Committee on 20 February 2008. The rebuild was completed in October 2010, and was officially opened on 30 March 2011 by The Countess of Wessex.

Both former sites enjoyed large playing fields, tennis courts and sports changing rooms.  Most of this space was lost as a result of the building of the new school. The new school still retains a large playing field, and since the completion of phase two of the Ad Lucem project possesses a sizeable Multi-Use Games Area. In January 2014 the planned extension to the Patterson block was complete, allowing more space for the Sixth Form and a much expanded hall.

Other Facilities information

 Phase one of the Ad Lucem project was completed in October 2010, meaning that the school is now located on one site, with an entrance from Buckingham Road, adjacent to the old Luker site.
 In January 2014 the planned extension to the Patterson block was complete, allowing more space for the Sixth Form and a much expanded hall.
 In early 2019, the Wormestall 6th Form Block was extended with a new Wormestall Conference Room and smaller Wormestall meeting room. These rooms were designed to accommodate more exam students during exam season. The rooms also act as new meeting rooms, meaning that the 6th Form has now been able to expand into two rooms previously used for meetings on the ground floor of the main block, while the new rooms are used for meetings. This development has allowed the 6th form to continue to expand. These rooms are also hired out by the school.
 The new school retains a large playing field, and since the completion of phase two of the Ad Lucem project possesses a sizeable Multi-Use Games Area.
 There is a large hall with a temporary stage, where assemblies and some lessons take place. Larger, whole school assemblies take place in the 'Hub', a central atrium at the heart of the building.
 The new school building has interactive whiteboards available in each classroom and many computer rooms.  Every student and teacher are unique users, able to access a personalized area of the network. Since 2007, every permanent teacher has had a laptop provided by the school, and all registration throughout the day is controlled through a student information system.
 Each House has a separate wing, or "block", within the new building. Every House block features an area dedicated to a specific subject. Most blocks have three floors, with the exception of the Patterson block which has two. Wormestall, the Sixth Form area, has three floors: a floor dedicated to computing and business studies; a floor encompassing the Sixth Form eatery and common room as well as teaching space for sociology, law and psychology; and a floor for the school's library.

The facilities are spread out as following: Curnock: English, Classics, Maths, Arts including Photography, Film and Media Studies. Davis: Product Design, Graphics and Textiles, Humanities. Evers: Science, Modern Foreign Languages. Patterson: PE, Drama, Dance, Music (Including Berkshire Maestros lessons).

History

The school was founded in 1466 from the legacy of Henry Wormestall who set aside £12 2s 4d annually for "teching gramar scole of the whiche that toune hath grete nede". St. Bartholomew's is therefore thought to be the 42nd oldest school in the UK still in existence.

 1466 Male-only St. Bartholomew's Boys' Grammar School founded in a building near the junction of Pound Street and Bartholomew Street. Moved to Wormestall around 1880.
 1904 Female-only Newbury County Girls Grammar School founded at the Newbury Technical Institute site in Northbrook Street.
 1910 Female-only Newbury County Girls Grammar School moved to the Luker site on the Andover Road.
 1966 The school celebrates quincentenary. School Pageant attended by Agatha Christie.
 26 May 1972 Visit by Queen Elizabeth II, who opens Luker Hall.
 1975 Newbury County Girls' Grammar School and St. Bartholomew's Boys' Grammar School merge to form the present-day comprehensive school.
 1993 School receives second visit from Queen Elizabeth II 
 September 2002 School designated as a Business and Enterprise College – a specialist school status
 22 November 2010, opening of the new St. Bartholomew's School buildings for academic purposes.
 30 March 2011, official opening of the new St Bartholomew's School building
 1 September 2011, St Bartholomew's School gains academy status

Narrative History

The earliest mention of an established grammar school in Newbury is in 1548 when the school is recorded as being at the Litten Chapel, part of St Bartholomew's hospital between Newtown Road and Argyle Street. The hospital itself was established in the late 12th century and by 1548 had been affected by the dissolution of the monasteries. There is a much quoted earlier will of a cloth merchant, Henry Wormestall who in his will dated 1466 bequeathed funding to pay for a teacher. The school took its name from the hospital and would remain at the Litten for centuries. In the 16th century Newbury was well known for its cloth and in particular the father and son merchants Jack O’Newbury who devised production line processes. The only head teacher known during the next 300 years is Thomas Parker, head teacher in 1630. In 1634 he left and led 100 Wiltshire men to found the town of Newbury, Massachusetts on the estuary of what became the Parker river on America's east coast, near Boston. He continued teaching there until his death in 1677. Part of this town of Newbury split off and became Newburyport in 1764.

The school survived the Civil wars including the two battles of Newbury but declined as its funds were appropriated by the unreformed  corporation in the late 18th century and in the early nineteenth century it closed. In 1849 a new body of trustees rebuilt the Litten and revived the school which opened with 60 boys being taught. The headmaster was Henry Newport.  In 1876 the headmaster was the Rev. J. Atkins. In 1885 the charity commissioners agreed to the provision of new buildings in Enborne Road at the corner with Buckingham Road for 150 pupils including 20 boarders. In 1902 the Rev. Atkins retired and was replaced by Edward Sharwood-Smith.  He had considerable enthusiasm for the school and in 1903 composed the school song and the school moto.  After the tragedy of the first world war he named four school houses after ex-pupils who had died in the 1914-8 period, three of them killed in action. These were Curnock, Davis, Evers and Patterson. Sharwood-Smith retired in 1924 and in 1925 he was replaced by the Rev.T.Rutherford-Harley. He led the school through the second world war and in 1948 was replaced by J. Andrew Ballantyne. In that year the combined cadet force (C.C.F.) was established at the school.  The 1950s was a period of recovery from the war, in which many of the teachers had fought. There were many older-style features – teachers wore gowns, the head master could still use the cane and games were restricted to cricket and rugby. In 1960 Andrew Ballantyne retired and was replaced by Basil E.D. Cooper. There followed a period of progressive reform.  In 1968 the boarding house closed and in 1975 he was to take over running of the comprehensive school formed by the merging of the boys' grammar school with the girls' high school at the other end of Buckingham Road.

The Newbury girls grammar school had opened in 1904 in the technical institute in Northbrook Street. Miss Esther Jane Luker was the first headmistress and seems to have had an enthusiasm and charisma to match that of Sharwood-Smith. Both led their schools through the first world war. In 1910 the girls' school moved to purpose-built premises in Andover Road with 250 pupils.  The school groups, equivalent to the houses at the boys' grammar school, were Jade, Flame, Blue and Gold. In 1933 Miss Luker retired. After the second world war Miss Ireland became headmistress in 1945. She retired in 1968 and was replaced by Miss Gray who carried on till the merger with the boys' grammar school in 1975 when, as noted above, Basil Cooper became headmaster of the combined comprehensive school.

The comprehensive school formed in 1975 took over the name of St Bartholomew's School together with its motto. Initially the school used the previous buildings with the boys' grammar school buildings given the name of Wormestall while the girls' high school buildings took on the name of Luker. The boys' house names were kept but each was merged with one of the girls' colour groups. In 1985 Basil Cooper retired and was replaced by Robert Mermagen. In 1994 he, too, retired and was replaced by Stuart Robinson. In 2009 he was replaced by Mrs Christina Haddrell but stayed on to cover the transfer to new school buildings in 2010. These were built between the sites of the two previous schools on Buckingham Road, but nearer the old girls' High School on the south-west side of Fifth Road. Both of the previous school buildings were converted into private flats. In 2011 the school gained academy status. In 2014 Mrs Haddrell retired and was replaced as Headmistress by Ms Julia Mortimore. In 2022 Ms Mortimore retired and was replaced as Headteacher by Dr David Fitter. St. Bartholomew's is one of only a few state schools to participate in the Combined Cadet Force (a programme sponsored by the Ministry of Defence), with around 200 cadets between the ages of 14 and 18.

Ofsted inspections
The school was last inspected by Ofsted in October 2021 and was rated 'outstanding'. The school notably achieved 'outstanding' in all categories of inspection.
The previous 2015 report and further short inspection in 2018 had rated the school as 'good'.

Alumni

The alumni of St. Bartholomew's are referred to as Old Newburians and include:

 Arron Banks - businessman, and pro-Brexit political donor
 Arthur Haddy - sound engineer
 Baroness Sue Hayman (née Bentley) - previously Labour MP for Workington in Cumbria, elected 2015
 Richard Houlston - Fellow of the Royal Society
 Hollie McNish (aka Hollie Poetry) - poet 
 Keston Sutherland - poet 
 John Edwin Midwinter – President of the Institution of Electrical Engineers
 Robert Newton – actor, perhaps best known for his portrayal of Long John Silver in the 1950 film version of Treasure Island
 Sir Denys Page – classicist 
 David Quarrey - UK Deputy National Security Adviser and former British Ambassador to Israel.
 Sir Anthony Skingsley - former RAF commander and Air chief marshal.
 Jon Solly – former long-distance runner, won gold medal in 10,000 metres event at 1986 Commonwealth Games
 Herbert Akroyd Stuart – inventor, noted for his invention of the Hot bulb engine.
 Lord Simon Stevens - Chief Executive of the NHS
 Jack Thorne – writer of The Fades, and contributing writer for Skins and Shameless
 Lucy Worsley – historian, curator, and television presenter

See also
 List of schools in the United Kingdom
 List of the oldest schools in the United Kingdom
 Specialist school

References

External links
 Official Homepage
 Parents' Association
 Old Newburians' Association
 History of the grammar school – written in 1958
 BBC News: Latest league tables
 A 1956 Memoir of the school.
 School creative writing group weblog

Educational institutions established in the 15th century
Schools in Newbury, Berkshire
1466 establishments in England

Secondary schools in West Berkshire District
Academies in West Berkshire District